Maling  is a village development committee in Lamjung District in the Gandaki Zone of northern-central Nepal. At the time of the 1991 Nepal census it had a population of 1745 people living in 337 individual households.

References

External links
UN map of the municipalities of Lamjung District

Populated places in Lamjung District